Francis Brennan (1873 – 6 November 1950) was an Australian lawyer and politician. He was a member of the Australian Labor Party (ALP) and served as Attorney-General in the Scullin Government (1929–1932). He was a member of the House of Representatives for over 35 years (1911–1931, 1934–1949), one of the longest periods of service. His brother Tom Brennan was a United Australia Party senator, a rare instance of family members representing opposing parties.

Early life
Brennan was born at Upper Emu Creek near Bendigo, Victoria and was a younger brother of Tom Brennan, later an assistant minister in the conservative Lyons government.  He studied law at the University of Melbourne and achieved an LL.B. in 1901. A prominent lay figure in Melbourne Catholicism, he established a legal business specialising in union cases. He joined the Labor Party in 1907 and unsuccessfully contested Bendigo in 1910, but won Batman at a by-election in 1911.  In 1913 he married Cecilia Mary O'Donnell.

Politics

Brennan was elected to the House of Representatives at the 1911 Batman by-election.

Following Labor's election win during 1929, Brennan became Attorney-General in the Scullin Ministry, but was not particularly effective in this role.  In any event, he lost his seat in the 1931 election as a result of the swing against Labor, which came about because of the Great Depression and the resultant split in the Labor Party.  Although Brennan had gone into the election holding Batman with a comfortably safe majority of 25.8 percent, he was defeated by United Australia Party challenger Samuel Dennis on an unheard-of swing (the biggest in Australian electoral history until that time) of 26.6 percent.  He recovered Batman in a rematch against Dennis in the 1934 election and held it until his retirement in 1949.

Personal life
Brennan was the father of prominent author Niall Brennan, a biographer of both Archbishop Daniel Mannix and businessman John Wren.

Brennan died of hypertensive vascular disease in Melbourne.

References

1873 births
1950 deaths
Australian people of Irish descent
Members of the Australian House of Representatives
Members of the Australian House of Representatives for Batman
Australian Labor Party members of the Parliament of Australia
Australian Roman Catholics
People from Bendigo
20th-century Australian politicians
University of Melbourne alumni politicians